Akinsanya Sunny Ajose (born ) is a Nigerian politician and public administrator. He served as Lagos State Head of Service from July 2004 – February 2006.

Early life and education
Akinsanya was born in Badagry, a town and local government area of Lagos State, South-Western Nigeria. His educational background started in 1954 when he enrolled as a pupil at Ijaiye Baptist Day School but he completed his primary school education at Tinubu Methodist Day School in 1959 and subsequently completed his secondary school education at Badagry Divisional Grammar School in 1964.

Akinsanya holds a B.A which he obtained in 1973 from the University of Illinois, Chicago, U.S.A after studying Liberal Arts and Science majoring in Political Science. In 1974, he obtained his M.A in Social Science from Governors State University.

Career
Prior to his employment as a civil servant, Ajose had previously worked as Personnel Programmes Administrator with IBM Nigeria Ltd from 1975 to 1978. In June 1979, he got employed as an Administrative Officer Grade VI after his deployment to the Civil Service Commission by the Lagos State Government. In 2004, Ajose was appointed by Bola Tinubu as Lagos State Head of Service till February 2006 when he attained the statutory retirement age.

In 2006, Bola Tinubu reappointed Akinsanya Sunny Ajose to serve as his Special Adviser until May 2007 when his tenure elapsed as governor of Lagos State. Akinsanya Ajose is currently a member of the Lagos State University Governing Council since September 16, 2015.

Awards and recognitions
Officer of the Order of the Niger  – 2014

References

1946 births
Living people
Yoruba politicians
People from Lagos State
All Progressives Congress politicians
Lagos State University people
University of Illinois Chicago alumni
Governors State University alumni